Walter Henry Porter (June 1858 – December 30, 1906) was an American Major League Baseball player born in Vergennes, Vermont who pitched for three teams during his six-year career.

Career
Porter began his career in the short-lived Union Association for the replacement team Milwaukee Brewers. It was for this team that he struck out 18 batters in one game on October 3, . When the Association folded following the season, he was picked up by the Brooklyn Grays, with whom he was their star pitcher. In , he had a record of 33 wins and 21 losses, followed up the next year with 27 wins and 19 losses.

He had a record of 18–37, leading the league in hits allowed, runs allowed, home runs allowed, and losses, but on June 6, he pitched a no-hitter against the Baltimore Orioles.

Post-career
Porter died in Brockton, Massachusetts at the age of 48, and is interred at Calvary Cemetery, also in Brockton.

See also
 List of Major League Baseball no-hitters

References

External links

1858 births
1906 deaths
19th-century baseball players
Major League Baseball pitchers
Milwaukee Brewers (UA) players
Brooklyn Grays players
Kansas City Cowboys players
Bay City (minor league baseball) players
Milwaukee Brewers (minor league) players
Hartford (minor league baseball) players
St. Joseph Clay Eaters players
London Tecumsehs (baseball) players
Baseball players from Vermont
People from Vergennes, Vermont